The men's 100 metres event at the 2009 Summer Universiade was held on 7–8 July.

Medalists

Results

Heats
Qualification: First 3 of each heat (Q) and the next 5 fastest (q) qualified for the quarterfinals.

Wind:Heat 1: -0.5 m/s, Heat 2: -0.9 m/s, Heat 3: -0.8 m/s, Heat 4: -1.7 m/s, Heat 5: -0.3 m/sHeat 6: -2.6 m/s, Heat 7: -1.0 m/s, Heat 8: -0.4 m/s, Heat 9: -0.4 m/s

Quarterfinals
Qualification: First 3 of each heat (Q) and the next 4 fastest (q) qualified for the semifinals.

Wind:Heat 1: -0.4 m/s, Heat 2: -0.1 m/s, Heat 3: -0.4 m/s, Heat 4: -0.1 m/s

Semifinals
Qualification: First 4 of each semifinal qualified directly (Q) for the final.

Wind:Heat 1: +0.1 m/s, Heat 2: +0.2 m/s

Final
Wind: -0.7 m/s

References
Results (archived)

100
2009